Geoffrey de Inverkunglas was a 12th-13th century Scottish noble who was the Sheriff of Perth, Crail and Fife.

Geoffrey was the son of Richard, the Steward of Kinghorn. Geoffrey was active during the later stages of the reign of King William the Lion of Scotland. He was granted the lands of Balwearie, Fife, confirmed by King William. He died c.1230 and was succeeded by his son Richard de Balwearie.

Citations

References
Barrow, G.W.S: The acts of William I, King of Scots, 1165–1214, Volume 2 of Regesta regum Scottorum. Edinburgh University Press, 1971.

12th-century Scottish judges
13th-century Scottish judges
Medieval Scottish knights